Sammie Lee Smith (born May 16, 1967 in Orlando, Florida) is a former American football player who was selected by the Miami Dolphins in the 1st round (9th overall) of the 1989 NFL Draft.  A 6'2", 226-lb. running back from Florida State University, Smith played in four NFL seasons from 1989 to 1992 for the Dolphins and Denver Broncos.

Smith has had numerous legal problems since leaving professional football. In 1996, he was convicted of two counts of possession and distribution of cocaine, and spent seven years in prison as a result. He won restoration of his civil rights from the State of Florida in June 2010.

In 2013, he was inducted into the Florida State Athletics Hall of Fame.

References

1967 births
Living people
Players of American football from Orlando, Florida
American football running backs
Florida State Seminoles football players
Miami Dolphins players
Denver Broncos players
American people convicted of drug offenses
Ed Block Courage Award recipients
Florida State Seminoles men's track and field athletes
American sportspeople convicted of crimes